Onițcani is a village in Criuleni District, Moldova.

Onițcani village is located in a picturesque location on the banks of the Dniester. The first mention in the annals found in 1604. The village is famous for its large number of springs. Some of them are very specific in their chemical composition. They are also the national heritage, as their age is several centuries, so they are under state protection. The village has a church, unique in its architecture, the only similar analogue of which can be seen only in Romania.

Population 
According to the 2004 Moldovan Census, the population of the Onițcani village is 2089 people (1011 men, 1078 women).

The ethnic composition of the village:

Gallery

References 

Villages of Criuleni District
Populated places on the Dniester